Sarah  or Sara Hart may refer to: 

 Sara Hart (writer) (pseudonym of Maureen Child; born 1951), American romance novelist
 Sarah Hart (columnist), British/Dutch columnist, born 1950
 Sarah Hart, murder victim of 19th-century criminal John Tawell
 Sarah B. Hart, British mathematician
 Sarah Hart, one of the perpetrators of the Hart family murders
 Sarah Hart, character from the 1982 science-fiction thriller film Anna to the Infinite Power
 Sarah Hart, character from the 2010 young adult science fiction novel I Am Number Four
 Sarah Hart (musician), American musician and songwriter